Sklarian Raiders are fictional characters appearing in the Legion of Super-Heroes comic books published by DC Comics, notably as a group of all female space pirates.  Created by Paul Levitz, James Sherman, and Bob Wiacek they first appeared in Superboy and the Legion of Super-Heroes #233 (November 1977).

Fictional characters biography
The United Planets gave much of its technology to Sklaria, but the Sklarian Raiders believe it was just enough to destroy their society and put their world on the brink of chaos. In desperate need of high tech equipment for their homeworld, they resorted piracy. They unsuccessfully attempt to steal an experimental Hyper-Time drive using force beamers and aerosleds from a group of Legionnaires while it is en route to their headquarters.  They next attempt to steal a computer bank storing research of a life extending serum from the Life Institute on an artificial island anchored in the North Sea and from Technos a biological lab on an asteroid permanently orbiting Earth by using a tractor beam from their starship.

A couple of years after making peace with the United Planets, Sklarian Raiders use their embassy in Hong Kong as a front to smuggle frozen organs off planet by using cargobots to load their freighters until they are caught by the Legion Espionage Squad.

References

External links
 

Legion of Super-Heroes
Characters created by Paul Levitz
Comics characters introduced in 1977